LaSalle is the most southerly borough (arrondissement) of the city of Montreal, Quebec, Canada. It is located in the south-west portion of the Island of Montreal, along the Saint Lawrence River. Prior to 2002, it was a separate municipality that had been incorporated in 1912.

History
LaSalle was named for the area's first seigneur, French explorer René-Robert Cavelier de La Salle (1643–1687). The area became part of a municipality during the mid 19th century, and LaSalle was incorporated as an independent municipality in 1912.

The Lachine Rapids are situated within LaSalle territory. The name Lachine, which is also the name of the neighbouring borough, stayed because the LaSalle area was part of the parish of Saints-Anges-de-la-Chine during the French regime period. Before the creation of the Lachine Canal in the 1820s, the rapids had to be portaged on a trail called Chemin LaSalle (what is now LaSalle Boulevard).

LaSalle is known for its many public schools, most notably l'École secondaire Cavelier-de-LaSalle, known as one of the top talent-producing schools in the fields of dance and song. The other common public school in LaSalle is LaSalle Community Comprehensive High School, opened many years ago and home to many cultures.

Michel Leduc, who served as mayor from 1983 to December 31, 2001, was the last mayor of an independent LaSalle. Under Leduc, LaSalle became the first large city in Quebec to launch a large recycling program. LaSalle was annexed by the city of Montreal on January 1, 2002, along with a number of other cities on the Island of Montreal.

Geography

LaSalle is bounded by five adjacent municipalities and boroughs, these being Lachine towards the west, Verdun and the Sud-Ouest neighbourhood of Ville-Émard to the north-east, and Montreal West and the neighbourhood of Notre-Dame-de-Grâce within the borough of Côte-des-Neiges–Notre-Dame-de-Grâce towards the north, the latter two being divided by Autoroute 20 as well as the Lachine Canal. To its south and east lies the shore of the Saint Lawrence River, specifically a portion of the river known as the Lachine Rapids.

Government

Federal and provincial elections

Federally, the western part of the borough is located in Dorval—Lachine—LaSalle and the eastern part in LaSalle—Émard—Verdun. They are represented by Anju Dhillon and David Lametti of the Liberal Party of Canada.

Provincially, the entire borough is within the electoral district of Marguerite-Bourgeoys represented by Fred Beauchemin of the Quebec Liberal Party.

Borough government

The borough is divided into two districts.

Cecil-P.-Newman (North)
Sault-Saint-Louis (South)

The borough elects a borough mayor, two city councillors, and four borough councillors.

As of the November 7, 2021 Montreal municipal election, the current borough council consists of the following councillors:

Demographics

Education

Post-secondary education
Cégep André-Laurendeau is in LaSalle.

Primary and secondary schools

The Centre de services scolaire Marguerite-Bourgeoys operates Francophone public schools.

Adult schools:
 Centre d'éducation des adultes de LaSalle (the Clément and LaSalle buildings are in LaSalle)

Professional development centres:
 Centre intégré de mécanique, de métallurgie et d'électricité (CIMME)

Secondary schools:
 École secondaire Cavelier-De LaSalle (ESCL)
 Nouvelle école secondaire LaSalle

Primary schools:
 de l'Orée-du-Parc
 des Découvreurs
 du Grand-Héron
 du Petit-Collège
 Henri-Forest
 Laurendeau-Dunton
 L'Eau-Vive
 Notre-Dame-des-Rapides
 Pierre-Rémy
 Sainte-Catherine-Labouré
 Sainte-Geneviève (Sud)
 Terre-des-Jeunes

The Lester B. Pearson School Board (LBPSB) operates Anglophone public schools.

Secondary schools:
 LaSalle Community Comprehensive High School

Primary schools:
Orchard Elementary School
Allion Elementary School
LaSalle Junior Elementary and LaSalle Senior Elementary
Children's World Elementary School (serves all areas)

Public libraries

The Montreal Public Libraries Network operates the L'Octagone Branch in Lasalle.

Cityscape

Among LaSalle's attractions are Angrignon Mall, the Lachine Canal and the Canal de l'Aqueduc, with their recreational areas; the Octagone library; the Parc Angrignon; the Île aux Hérons migratory bird refuge; the Saints-Anges archeological site; Des Rapides Park; and the Fleming windmill, which is used as the borough's symbol. Other major installations include the Cégep André-Laurendeau.

Economy
LaSalle's main economic engines include industries and agrifoods:

 Seagram's Distillery
 Fleischmann's Yeast
 Labatt's Brewery
 Angrignon Taxi
 Carrefour Angrignon

Infrastructure

LaSalle is served by the LaSalle commuter train station on the Candiac Line. Route 138 passes through the borough before crossing the Honoré Mercier Bridge to Kahnawake. Other important thoroughfares include LaSalle, Newman, La Vérendrye, Bishop Power, Champlain, Shevchenko, Dollard, Lapierre, Centrale and Jean-Brillon Boulevards.

Despite its name, the Montreal Metro station of LaSalle is not located in LaSalle, but on a portion of the boulevard of the same name in Verdun.

Sports and recreation

LaSalle also has various sports teams, the football association (Warriors), the hockey association (Cougars), the baseball association (LaSalle Cardinals) and the soccer association (LaSalle Rapids) which remain popular. The Cardinals play their home games at Stade Éloi-Viau. The first ever cricket team called "LaSalle Strikers" came into existence in 2015. Former home of Pop Harrigan Hockey and LaSalle Colts Football.

Notable residents, former and current

Notable people
 John Campbell, city councilor and federal liberal member of Parliament 
Régine Chassagne, indie rock singer, member of Arcade Fire
Michel Leduc (~1931-2012), last mayor of LaSalle (1983-2001) before amalgamation
Stéphane Rousseau, actor and comedian, born 1966 in LaSalle
Mononc' Serge, singer-songwriter and former bassist of Les Colocs, born 1970 in LaSalle
Marie-Élaine Thibert, pop singer, born 1982 in LaSalle
Jonathan Emile, reggae and hiphop singer, born 1986 in LaSalle

Notable athletes
Jo-Anne Beaumier, Lebanese-Canadian footballer
Chris Benoit, Canadian wrestler
Patrick Carpentier, race car driver
William Carrier, NHL hockey player
Jeff Chychrun, retired NHL hockey player
Nicolas Deslauriers, NHL hockey player 
Miguel Duhamel, professional motorcycle racer
Yvon Duhamel, professional motorcycle racer
Daniel Guérard, retired NHL hockey player
Mike Krushelnyski, retired NHL hockey player
Patrick Labrecque, hockey coach and former player
Jacques Lemaire, retired NHL hockey player
Mike O'Neill, retired NHL hockey player
Gaetano Orlando, retired NHL hockey player
Eliezer Sherbatov (born 1991), Canadian-Israeli ice hockey player
Gilles Gratton retired NHL goaltender.

See also

 Montreal Merger
 Boroughs of Montreal
 Districts of Montreal
 Municipal reorganization in Quebec

References

http://www.census2006.ca/census-recensement/2006/dp-pd/prof/92-591/details/page.cfm?Lang=E&Geo1=CSD&Code1=2466040&Geo2=PR&Code2=24&Data=Count&SearchText=lasalle&SearchType=Begins&SearchPR=24&B1=All&Custom=
http://www12.statcan.ca/english/census01/products/highlight/ETO/Table1.cfm?T=501&Lang=E&GV=4&GID=2466040&Prov=24&S=1&O=D
http://ville.montreal.qc.ca/pls/portal/docs/PAGE/MTL_STATS_FR/MEDIA/DOCUMENTS/PROFIL_SOCIOD%C9MO_LASALLE.PDF

External links
Ville de Montreal - Lasalle

 
Populated places established in 1845
Populated places disestablished in 2002
Boroughs of Montreal
Former municipalities in Quebec
Former cities in Quebec
Quebec populated places on the Saint Lawrence River
Italian Canadian settlements